Horn A-Plenty is a big band album by Al Hirt that was released in 1962 by RCA Victor. The album was arranged and conducted by Billy May and performed by a group of top Hollywood session musicians.

The album reached number twenty four on the Billboard 200 chart.

Track listing 
 "Holiday for Trumpet" (Mario Ruiz Armengol)
 "That Old Feeling" (Sammy Fain, Lew Brown)
 "Easy Street" (Harold Arlen, Johnny Mercer)
 "Baby Won't You Please Come Home" (Charles Warfield, Clarence Williams)
 "Till There Was You" (Meredith Willson)
 "Margie" (Con Conrad, J. Russel Robinson, Benny Davis)
 "Swing Low, Sweet Chariot" (Traditional)
 "Theme from Carnival" ("Love Makes the World Go 'Round") (Bob Merrill)
 "Do Nothin' Till You Hear From Me" (Duke Ellington, Bob Russell)
 "Rumpus" (Ann Ronell)
 "Memories of You" (Andy Razaf, Eubie Blake)
 "I'll Take Romance" (Oscar Hammerstein II, Ben Oakland)

Chart positions

References

1962 albums
Al Hirt albums
Albums produced by Steve Sholes
Albums arranged by Billy May
RCA Records albums